Verrucaria yoshimurae is a species of saxicolous (rock-dwelling), crustose lichen in the family Verrucariaceae. Found in Japan, it was formally described as a new species in 2011 by lichenologist Hiroshi Harada. This freshwater lichen has a relatively pale thallus. The species epithet honours Japanese botanist and lichenologist Isao Yoshimura.

See also
List of Verrucaria species

References

External links
 Natural History Museum & Institute, Chiba Images of the holotype specimen

yoshimurae
Lichen species
Lichens described in 2011
Lichens of Japan